D.C. Simpson may refer to:

Dana Claire Simpson, American cartoonist.

David Capell Simpson, British biblical scholar.

Douglas Colborne Simpson, Canadian architecture.